The 2021 Girls' EuroHockey Youth Championships was the 11th edition of the Girls' EuroHockey Youth Championship. It was held from 19 to 24 July 2021 at the Estadio Betero in Valencia, Spain.

Qualified teams
The following teams participated in the 2021 EuroHockey Youth Championship:

Results
All times are local (UTC+2).

Pool

Fixtures

References

External links
European Hockey Federation

Girls' EuroHockey Youth Championships
Youth
EuroHockey Youth Championships
EuroHockey Youth Championships
EuroHockey Youth Championships